Parliamentary elections were held in the Federated States of Micronesia on 8 March 2005, alongside a three-part referendum. As no political parties existed, all 23 candidates for the 10 available seats in Congress ran as Independents.

In the referendums voters were asked whether they approved of three proposed amendments to the constitution. These would remove the power of the Supreme Court to rule on land and water issues, give the states credit for their acts, and lift the ban on dual citizenship. The proposed amendments required a 75% majority in at least three of the four states. However, the Supreme Court proposal failed to pass the threshold in all four states, whilst only Chuuk State had over 75% in favour of the other two proposals.

Results

Congress

|-
! style="background-color:#E9E9E9;text-align:left;vertical-align:top;" width=450|Members
! style="background-color:#E9E9E9;text-align:right;" |Seats
|-
| style="text-align:left;" |Non-partisans
| style="text-align:right;" |14
|-
|style="text-align:left;background-color:#E9E9E9"|Total (turnout  %)
|width="30" style="text-align:right;background-color:#E9E9E9"|14
|}

Referendums

Supreme Court

States

Dual citizenship

References

Elections in the Federated States of Micronesia
2005 elections in Oceania
Parliamentary election
2005 referendums
Referendums in the Federated States of Micronesia